Salve Regina University is a private Roman Catholic university in Newport, Rhode Island, United States. It was founded in 1934 by the Sisters of Mercy and is accredited by the New England Commission of Higher Education. The university enrolls more than 2,700 undergraduate and graduate students annually.

Its 80-acre historical campus, bordering the coastal Newport Cliff Walk in the state of Rhode Island, is set on seven contiguous Gilded Age estates with 21 structures of historic significance. The university is home to the Pell Center for International Relations and Public Policy.

It is a member of the NCAA Division III and in 2018 about 460 students – about 17% of the student body – participated in intercollegiate athletics.

History
On March 6, 1934, the state of Rhode Island granted a charter to the Sisters of Mercy of Providence for a corporation to be named Salve Regina College (translated from the Latin as "Hail Queen"). The charter specified that the college would exist "to promote virtue, and piety and learning". In 1947 the corporation received the gift of Ochre Court, a 50-room Newport mansion, and admitted its first class of 58 students in the autumn of that year.  The college's first president was Mary Matthew Doyle (1870–1960), who was also the first Mother Provincial of the Sisters of Mercy of Providence.

During the 1950s two more buildings were added to the campus: Moore Hall, originally built in 1890, was donated to the college in 1955 by Cornelius Moore, a former Newport mayor and chairman of the original board of trustees; McAuley Hall, originally the Vinland Estate, was donated to the college in 1955 by the daughter of Florence Adele Vanderbilt Twombly.

It was originally a women's college. It became coeducational in 1973, added graduate programs in 1975 and achieved university status in 1991. The changes came about during the tenure of its longest-serving president, Lucille McKillop, who headed the institution from 1973 until 1994. During that time the school went from 1000 students studying nine majors to over 2300 students studying 25 majors.

By 2000 the campus had expanded to 60 acres and included 18 buildings of historical significance. The university received an Historic Preservation Award from the Rhode Island Historical Preservation and Heritage Commission in 2000 for its work in the preservation and "sensitive adaptation" of the buildings and the 1999 National Preservation Award from the National Trust for Historic Preservation. In 2002 the university received a Getty Grant Program award to develop a campus heritage preservation plan.

In December 2015 the university received a Tree Campus USA designation, a program of the Arbor Day Foundation which recognizes and encourages the best practices of planting and caring for campus trees and the engagement of students in environmental stewardship. The university was also accredited by the Morton Arboretum as a Level II arboretum for its historic trees and landscapes in 2016.

Rankings 

 For 2021, the school was listed by the Princeton Review in the Best Colleges: Northeastern category. It was ranked 31st in the Regional Universities (North) Category by U.S. News & World Report magazine. The Times Higher Education World University Rankings ranked Salve in the top 401th – 500th category of U.S. colleges.
 For 2020, it was ranked 23rd in the Regional Universities (North) category by U.S. News & World Report magazine, and was ranked as one of The 50 Most Beautiful College Campuses in America by Condé Nast Traveler magazine. Money magazine ranked Salve as the 352nd best college in the United States.
 For 2018, it was ranked among the Top 50 Most Beautiful Colleges in America by Architectural Digest magazine. Money magazine ranked it as one of the Most Transformative Colleges in the U.S.

Academics

The university offers associate, bachelor's, master's and doctoral degrees in a variety of majors. The university has two PhD programs, in international relations and the humanities. The university also offers the Doctor of Nursing Practice (DNP). It is accredited by the New England Association of Schools and Colleges with additional accreditation from other bodies for professional programs such as business studies, visual arts, counseling, education, nursing, and social work.

According to the university, in the three years prior to 2016, it received an average of 5,000 yearly applications, of which 3,000 students were admitted from 35 US states and 20 other countries. Admission to the nursing program is more selective, with 40 percent of nursing applications typically accepted. There are also a number of study abroad programs.

Financial aid is offered through a variety of grants, scholarships, loans and part-time work-study employment. Some of the programs are funded by outside bodies and others funded by the university itself. The university also participates in the Post-9/11 GI Bill Yellow Ribbon Program to provide educational funding for veterans and their families.

Buildings

Antone Academic Center
Named for Therese Antone, who was president from 1994 to 2009, the Antone Academic Center for Culture and the Arts houses facilities for several academic departments and programs, including art, cultural and historic preservation, English communications and media, and music, theatre and dance. It was completed in 2008 and involved combining and restoring the carriage house and stable complexes of two historic buildings — Wetmore Hall, belonging to Chateau-sur-Mer, and Mercy Hall belonging to Ochre Court.

McAuley Hall
McAuley Hall, named after Catherine McAuley, founder of the Sisters of Mercy, was originally the main building of the Vinland Estate, built in 1882 for the tobacco heiress Catharine Lorillard Wolfe. It was acquired by the university in 1955 and was at first a residence hall and library. It now houses classrooms and academic department offices.

McKillop Library
The main library is named for Lucille McKillop, who was president from 1973 to 1994. It was built in 1991 and holds approximately 150,000 volumes.

Miley Hall
Named for M. Hilda Miley, the second president, Miley Hall was built in 1964 on the former site of Mary Frick Garrett Jacobs' Whiteholme estate. It serves as a residence hall for first-year students and also houses the cafeteria, bookstore, and offices for student services.

Ochre Court
Ochre Court, built between 1890 and 1895, and once the summer residence of Ogden Goelet, is now the university's central administration building. Concerts, lectures, and special functions are held in the ballrooms on the ground floor. The Goelet family gave Ochre Court to the Sisters of Mercy in 1947, enabling the establishment of the college. It was at first the only building, and housed the dormitories for the original 58 students, classrooms, a library, and the dining hall. At the time, the faculty consisted of eight Sisters of Mercy who lived in the mansion's former servant quarters.

O'Hare Academic Center
Named for Mary James O'Hare, the university's first academic dean, the O'Hare Academic Center houses classrooms, laboratories, faculty offices, the Bazarsky Lecture Hall and the Jazzman's Cafe. It was built in 1968, and in 2015 underwent a major renovation and expansion project scheduled to conclude in June 2017.

Our Lady of Mercy Chapel
The chapel and interfaith prayer room are on the main floor of the building, which was completed in September 2010. It was built, in part, to house three large figurative stained glass windows and ten smaller ones by John La Farge. They were originally created in 1890–1891 for the private chapel of the Caldwell sisters in Newport. When the Caldwell house was demolished in 1931, the windows went to the Sisters of Mercy convent chapel in Fall River, Massachusetts, and were subsequently acquired by the university when the convent was torn down 2004. Wood salvaged from the Fall River convent has been incorporated into the altar base and celebrant's chair. The steeple contains three bells made by the Meneely Bell Foundry in 1910, which formerly hung in a church in Lawrence, Massachusetts. The Mercy Center for Spiritual Life is on the lower level of the building and provides space for student activities and offices for campus ministers.

Rodgers Recreation Center
Named for Thomas Rodgers Jr., a trustee and benefactor of the university, the center was completed in 2000. It houses the university's athletic and recreational facilities.

Gerety Hall
Originally known as Wakehurst, a mansion built in 1887 for James J. Van Alen, was acquired by the university from the Van Alen family in 1972. A replica of Wakehurst Place in England, Wakehurst houses classrooms and faculty offices and serves as a hub for student recreational activities and campus events. The name was changed to Gerety Hall in May 2019 after the retirement of president Jane Gerety.

Young Building

Named for the university benefactors Anita O'Keeffe and Robert R. Young, the Young Building is the home of the Pell Center for International Relations and Public Policy and is also a residence for sophomore students in the Pell Honors Program. It was originally Fairlawn, a mansion built in the 1850s for the Boston lawyer Andrew Ritchie and later owned by Levi P. Morton. It was acquired by the university in 1997.

Athletics

The university competes in Division III of the National Collegiate Athletic Association. It is a member of the Commonwealth Coast Conference and its quasi-independent football arm, Commonwealth Coast Football, and offers ten sports for women (soccer, field hockey, tennis, cross country, basketball, ice hockey, volleyball, softball, track and field, and lacrosse), eight for men (football, cross country, soccer, basketball, ice hockey, tennis, baseball, and lacrosse), and one co-ed sport (sailing). It also has a club sports program. The men's and women's rugby clubs compete in the Colonial Coast Rugby Conference.

Alumni

Arts 
 Betty Hutton, actress
 Kristin Hersh, musician
 Jean-Baptiste, songwriter

Business 
 Janet L. Robinson, publishing executive

Military
 Robert J. Papp, Jr., admiral
 Anthony C. Zinni, general
 Stanley A. McChrystal, general
 Peter W. Chiarelli, general
 Michael J. Noonan, vice admiral
 Joseph D. Stewart, vice admiral
 George J. Trautman, III, lieutenant general
 James J. Lovelace, lieutenant general
 Martin R. Steele, lieutenant general
 Frances C. Wilson, lieutenant general
 Antonio M. Taguba, major general
 James W. Nuttall, major general
 Ronald G. Richard, major general
 Stephen A. Turcotte, rear admiral 
 Louis Iasiello, rear admiral 
 Arnold Resnicoff 
 Barry C. Black, rear admiral

Politics and law
 Karen Carroll, justice
 Arlene Violet, Rhode Island attorney general

See also

Story in the Public Square
List of current and historical women's universities and colleges in the United States
Association of Catholic Colleges and Universities
List of Roman Catholic universities and colleges in the United States
Seaview Terrace (aka Carey Mansion)

References

Further reading
 McKillop, Lucille (Summer 1986). "Salve Regina—The Newport College". New Directions for Higher Education, Vol. 1986, Issue 54, pp. 77–85 . .
 Our Lady of Mercy Chapel, catalogue for the exhibition John La Farge and the Recovery of the Sacred, McMullen Museum of Art, September 1 – December 13, 2015. (Illustrated article on the three large stained glass windows by La Farge in the chapel)

External links

Official athletics website

 
1934 establishments in Rhode Island
Association of Catholic Colleges and Universities
Buildings and structures in Newport, Rhode Island
University and college buildings on the National Register of Historic Places in Rhode Island
Education in Newport County, Rhode Island
Educational institutions established in 1934
Former women's universities and colleges in the United States
Peabody and Stearns buildings
Richard Morris Hunt buildings
Roman Catholic Diocese of Providence
Catholic universities and colleges in Rhode Island
Sisters of Mercy colleges and universities
Private universities and colleges in Rhode Island
Vanderbilt family
Tourist attractions in Newport, Rhode Island
National Register of Historic Places in Newport, Rhode Island
New England Hockey Conference teams